Mid-State Technical College (Mid-State) is a technical college in central Wisconsin with major campuses in the Marshfield, Stevens Point, and Wisconsin Rapids communities. There is also a learning center in Adams. It is a member of the 16 schools in the Wisconsin Technical College System.

Mid-State Technical College is accredited by the Higher Learning Commission of the North Central Association (NCA).

References

External links
Official website

Wisconsin technical colleges
Stevens Point, Wisconsin
Education in Portage County, Wisconsin
Education in Marathon County, Wisconsin
Education in Wood County, Wisconsin
Education in Adams County, Wisconsin
NJCAA athletics